El Rosario is a municipality in the northeastern part of the island of Tenerife in the Santa Cruz de Tenerife province, on the Canary Islands, Spain. The seat of the municipality is the town La Esperanza, in the mountainous interior of the island. The municipality includes the coastal town Radazul. The TF-1 motorway passes through the southern part of the municipality.

The population is 15,542 (2013), its area is 39.43 km².

Historical population

Education

The Deutsche Schule Santa Cruz de Tenerife, a German international school, is located in the Tabaita Alta section of El Rosario.

See also
List of municipalities in Santa Cruz de Tenerife

References 

Municipalities in Tenerife